Al-Mundhir, meaning "the warner", hellenized as Alamoundaros and Latinized as Alamundarus and Alamoundaras, can refer to:

 al-Mundhir I ibn al-Nu'man, King of the Lakhmids (r. 418–462)
 al-Mundhir II ibn al-Nu'man, King of the Ghassanids (r. 453–472)
 al-Mundhir II ibn al-Mundhir, King of the Lakhmids (r. 490–497)
 al-Mundhir III ibn al-Nu'man, King of the Lakhmids (r. 503/5–554)
 al-Mundhir III ibn al-Harith, King of the Ghassanids (r. 569–581)
 al-Mundhir IV ibn al-Mundhir, King of the Lakhmids (r. 574–580)
 al-Mundhir of Córdoba (c. 842 – 888), Umayyad Emir of Córdoba (r. 886–888)
 al-Mundhir bin Sawa (fl. early 7th century), ruler of Bahrain during the time of Muhammad